Anthony Abadies Pinthus (born April 4, 1998) is a Filipino-Swiss professional footballer who plays as a goalkeeper for Philippines Football League (PFL) club United City and the Philippines national team. Born in Switzerland to a Swiss father and Filipino mother, he has represented the Philippines at the youth level.

Club career
Born and raised in Switzerland, he began his football career at Grasshopper Club Zürich, where he played for the club's youth teams. He was loaned out to 1. Liga clubs United Zürich and FC Wohlen before ending his contract with Grasshoppers.

In early 2020, Pinthus joined the Azkals Development Team (ADT) of the Philippines Football League (PFL) and was eventually loaned out in August to fellow PFL club United City. He made his PFL debut on 28 October, keeping a clean sheet for United City as they defeated his parent club ADT, 1–0. He was awarded the PFL Golden Glove for keeping three clean sheets and conceding only one goal in the whole 2020 season.

On 16 January 2021, United City announced that they have signed in Pinthus on a permanent basis owing to his performance while on loan with the club.

International career
Pinthus is eligible to play for the Philippines, Switzerland, and the Republic of Ireland.

Philippines U23
Pinthus played as the starting goalkeeper of the Philippine U-23 that competed in the Southeast Asian Games held in the Philippines.

Philippines
He made his debut for the Philippines in a 4–1 friendly win against Timor Leste in Bali, Indonesia.

Personal life
Pinthus was born in Solothurn, Switzerland to a Filipina mother who hails from Cagayan de Oro, and a Swiss father who is half Swiss and half Irish. He started playing football at a young age, taught by his father. Growing up, his football idol was Real Madrid and Spain goalkeeper Iker Casillas.

Honours
United City
 Philippines Football League: 2020,
Copa Paulino Alcantara: 2022
Individual
 Philippines Football League Golden Glove:2020
Copa Paulino Alcantara Golden Glove: 2022

References

External links

Living people
1998 births
People from Solothurn
Sportspeople from the canton of Solothurn
Filipino footballers
Philippines youth international footballers
Swiss men's footballers
Filipino people of Swiss descent
Filipino people of Irish descent
Swiss people of Filipino descent
Swiss people of Irish descent
Citizens of the Philippines through descent
Association football goalkeepers
Grasshopper Club Zürich players
FC Wohlen players
Azkals Development Team players